Pacific Community Association Building, also known as Pacific Community YMCA and The 'Y', is a historic community center located at Columbia, South Carolina. The original section was built in 1903, and is a large two-story, irregularly-shaped brick building. It was enlarged around 1918 with the addition of the pool building, and a large gymnasium in 1923.  It provided recreational opportunities for residents of mill villages associated with the Olympia and Granby Mill complex.

It was added to the National Register of Historic Places in 2007.

References

Event venues on the National Register of Historic Places in South Carolina
Buildings and structures completed in 1903
Buildings and structures in Columbia, South Carolina
National Register of Historic Places in Columbia, South Carolina